Ernst Hansen (29 October 1892 – 8 May 1968) was a Danish painter. His work was part of the painting event in the art competition at the 1932 Summer Olympics.

References

1892 births
1968 deaths
20th-century Danish painters
Danish male painters
Olympic competitors in art competitions
People from Ringkøbing-Skjern Municipality
20th-century Danish male artists